Arthaud is a surname. Notable people with the surname include:

Florence Arthaud (1957–2015), French sailor
Nathalie Arthaud (born 1970), French politician
René Arthaud (1915–2007), French politician

See also may refer to:

Artaldus, also known as Arthaud, was a 13th-century Carthusian Bishop of Belley

French-language surnames